Caenopedina novaezealandiae is a species of sea urchins of the Family Pedinidae. Their armour is covered with spines. Caenopedina novaezealandiae was first scientifically described in 1964 by Pawson.

References

Animals described in 1964
Pedinoida